Makoto Ninomiya and Riko Sawayanagi were the defending champions, but Sawayanagi chose not to participate. Ninomiya partnered Robu Kajitani, but lost in the quarterfinals. 

Hsu Ching-wen and Ksenia Lykina won the title, defeating Dalma Gálfi and Xu Shilin in the final, 7–6(7–5), 6–2.

Seeds

Draw

References 
 Draw

Kurume Best Amenity Cup - Doubles
Kurume Best Amenity Cup